The Illusion Hills are small escarpment-like hills located between the Lichen Hills and the Vantage Hills at the head of Rennick Glacier in Victoria Land, Antarctica. They were named by the northern party of the New Zealand Geological Survey Antarctic Expedition, 1962–63, because they were found to be much more distant than anticipated. These hills lie situated on the Pennell Coast, a portion of Antarctica lying between Cape Williams and Cape Adare.

References

Hills of Victoria Land
Pennell Coast